The Delaware Handicap was an American Thoroughbred horse race held between 1901 and 1937 at Saratoga Race Course in Saratoga Springs, New York. An event for horses of either sex age three and older, it was contested on dirt over a distance of one mile. While fillies accounted for just under a third of the winners, their victories were marked by a number of dominating performances.

Historical notes
First run on August 17, 1901, the race was won by Frank Farrell's three-year-old colt, Blues. The distance for this inaugural event was set at a mile and one-sixteenth after which it would be permanently shortened to one mile.

The sole two-time winner of the Delaware Handicap was John Sanford's very good filly Molly Brant who won in 1904 and 1905. Owner John Sanford, in partnership with father Stephen Sanford, had won the 1902 edition and John would win it for a record fourth time in 1907.

The 1908 passage of the Hart–Agnew anti-betting legislation by the New York Legislature under Republican Governor Charles Evans Hughes led to a state-wide shutdown of racing in 1911 and 1912.  A February 21, 1913 ruling by the New York Supreme Court, Appellate Division saw horse racing return in 1913. 

Gifford Cochran's fleet filly Fairy Wand, ridden by future U.S. Racing Hall of Fame inductee Clarence Kummer, won the 1919 Delaware Handicap in a time of 1:36 1/5 which equaled the American record for the one-mile distance.

On August 13, 1937, William Ziegler Jr.'s Esposa easily captured the thirty-fifth and final running of the Delaware Handicap. Esposa would go on to earn recognition as that year's American Champion Older Female Horse featured by her win in November's Bowie Handicap, a mile and five-eighths endurance test in which she broke the Pimlico track record while beating the mighty Seabiscuit. Esposa would prove herself again in 1938 when she would repeat as the U.S. Champion.

Records
Speed record:
 1:36.20 @ 1 mile: Sun Briar (1918)
 1:36.20 @ 1 mile: Fairy Wand (1919)

Most wins:
 2 - Molly Brant (1904,1905)

Most wins by a jockey:
 2 - Willie Knapp (1905,1918)
 2 - Joe McCahey (1908, 1909)
 2 - Clarence Kummer (1919, 1922)
 2 - Willie Kelsay (1924, 1930)

Most wins by a trainer:
 3 - Henry McDaniel (1918, 1930, 1931)
 3 - Thomas J. Healey (1908, 1914, 1923)

Most wins by an owner:
 4 - John Sanford (1902*, 1904, 1905, 1907)

Winners

 * "Son of Stephen is John Sanford

References

Open mile category horse races
Discontinued horse races in New York (state)
Recurring sporting events established in 1901
Recurring sporting events disestablished in 1938
Saratoga Race Course